Luctor is a ghost town in Prairie View Township, Phillips County, Kansas, United States.

History
Luctor was issued a post office in 1885. The post office was discontinued in 1903. The population in 1910 was 53.

References

Former populated places in Phillips County, Kansas
Former populated places in Kansas